Mala Vrbnica may refer to:

 Mala Vrbnica (Kruševac)
 Mala Vrbnica (Brus)